Winston Monseque was an American R&B producer and personal manager, best known for his association with Motown.  He produced the top 15 US Billboard R&B chart hit single "She's Just a Groupie" by Bobby Nunn and the critically acclaimed Táta Vega album, Totally Táta. He was also one of the first producers to work with Teena Marie after she arrived at the label.

Life and career

Winston Carlos Monseque was a native of Trinidad.

Andrew Hamilton, in his four star review in the AllMusic Guide stated that Táta Vegas's album, "Totally Táta is a marvelous production by Winston Monseque."

References

American record producers
Living people
Trinidad and Tobago emigrants to the United States
1939 births